The president of the Slovak Republic is the head of state of Slovakia and the commander-in-chief of the Armed Forces. The president is directly elected by the people for five years, and can be elected for a maximum of two consecutive terms. The presidency is largely a ceremonial office, but the president does exercise certain limited powers with absolute discretion. The president's official residence is the Grassalkovich Palace in Bratislava.

History of the office
The office was established by the constitution of Slovakia on 1 January 1993 when Slovakia permanently split from Czechoslovakia and became independent. The office was vacant until 2 March 1993, when the first president Michal Kováč was elected by the National Council of Slovak Republic. However, in 1998, the National Council was unable to elect a successor to Kováč. As a result, for half a year after Kováč's term ended in March 1998, the position was vacant. The duties and powers of the office devolved upon the then prime minister and speaker of the National Council. To resolve the issue, the constitution was changed to provide for popular election of the president. Presidential elections have been held in 1999, 2004, 2009, 2014 and 2019.

The current president is Zuzana Čaputová, who took office on 15 June 2019.

Role and powers
The president of Slovakia has a limited role in policy-making, as the office is largely ceremonial within the framework of a parliamentary republic. According to the constitution, the president is the supreme representative of the state both in Slovakia and abroad.

The president represents the Slovak Republic externally and concludes and ratifies international treaties. The president may delegate to the Government or, with the Government's consent, to individual members of the Slovak Republic, the conclusion of international treaties. Historically all Slovak presidents delegated this power to the Government. Technically it is officially done by Decision of President No. 250/2001 Coll. (which superseded Decision of President No. 205/1993 Coll.), which is still in effect.

Among the president's constitutional powers are nominating and appointing the prime minister. The president's choice is not limited, but by constitution the president through their decisions ensures due performance of constitutional bodies. Because the government of whoever is appointed prime minister must receive a vote of confidence in parliament, the president usually appoints the leader of the winning party or coalition in parliamentary elections.

The president has sole discretion to appoint three members of the judicial council, one member of the Budget Council, and two members of the council of the Nation's Memory Institute; to award distinctions, to appoint the president and vice-president of the Constitutional Court of the Slovak Republic (from among the Constitutional Court judges), and to grant pardon or parole.

The president can also veto any bill or proposal by the National Council, except for constitutional amendments. This veto can be overridden if the National Council passes the same bill again with a majority of all members of the council, so this power is considered quite weak.

The president is formally the commander-in-chief of the Slovak armed forces, but this role is ceremonial, because by the constitution when the president acts as the commander-in-chief their decision is valid only after it is signed by the prime minister or a minister authorized by the prime minister, and in such cases the Government is responsible for the president's decision. The same applies to grants of amnesty and appointments of chiefs of diplomatic missions.

Among their other constitutional duties are signing bills into law, appointing ministers on the recommendation of the prime minister, and appointing various other state officials, such as generals, professors, judges, rectors, and prosecutors.

The president has discretionary power over the appointments of some officials. For example, there have been cases when the president has refused to appoint vice-governors of the National Bank of Slovakia recommended by government. These actions of the president were confirmed by the Constitutional Court.

In many cases the appointment of state officials is regulated by other laws. For example, the president's power to appoint constitutional judges is limited to selection from nominees voted by the National Council, from which the president has to appoint half. The appointment or recall of judges is determined by decisions of the Judicial Council, which submits its proposals to the president.

Presidential powers are substantially increased in the special circumstance when the National Council passes a vote of no confidence in the government. In such a case, many executive powers of government (e.g. appointment of officials, foreign trips, signing treaties) are subject to the approval of the president.

Succession
In the case when the president is unable to perform their duties or if the presidency becomes vacant for any reason, the speaker of the National Council and the Government, led by the prime minister, jointly perform the duties of the president.

List of Presidents of Slovakia

Slovak Republic (1993–present)

Acting presidents

Latest election

See also
List of presidents of Czechoslovakia
List of prime ministers of Slovakia
List of leaders of Slovak parliaments

References

Political history of Slovakia
Slovakia
 
Government of Slovakia
Presidents
1993 establishments in Slovakia